Santana Terrell Moss (born June 1, 1979) is an American former professional football player who was a wide receiver in the National Football League (NFL) for fourteen seasons. He played college football for the University of Miami, where he earned All-American honors.  Moss was picked by the New York Jets in the first round of the 2001 NFL Draft, where he spent 4 seasons with the team, before playing for the Washington Redskins for 10 seasons. Moss was selected to the All-Pro in 2005.

Early years
Moss was born in Miami, Florida.  He attended Miami Carol City Senior High, and played high school football for the Carol City Chiefs.  He led the team with 25 receptions for 600 yards and 12 touchdowns as a senior, and amassed 450 yards on 12 kickoff returns with one return touchdown that year.  Moss earned third-team all-state football honors following his senior season.

College career
Moss attended the University of Miami, and joined the Miami Hurricanes football team in 1997 as a walk-on, before being awarded a scholarship after the season's third game.  He went on to break the Hurricanes' record (previously held by Michael Irvin) for most receiving yards (with 2,546 yards).  He finished his 2000 senior season with 1,604 all-purpose yards, received first-team All-Big East Conference honors, and was recognized a consensus first-team All-American. Moss also became the first player to earn Big East Offensive Player of the Year and Special Teams Player of the Year honors in the same season.

Moss is an important figure in Miami Hurricanes football history, generally considered (along with Irvin) to be one of the most accomplished wide receivers in the university's history.  He graduated as the school's all-time leader in receiving yards (2,546), punt return yards (1,196), and all-purpose yards (4,394).  Moss was interviewed about his time at the University of Miami for the documentary The U, which premiered December 12, 2009 on ESPN.  He was inducted into the University of Miami Sports Hall of Fame in 2011.

College statistics

Track and field
Moss was also a standout track athlete for the Miami Carol City Senior High track team. He was a two-time state champion in the triple jump and won state title in the long jump during junior season. He set a school record in the triple jump with leap of 14.81 meters.

He also ran track for the Miami Hurricanes track and field team, and was named the "Most Outstanding Field Performer" for the 2000 Big East Outdoor Track and Field championships. He won the triple jump at the 2000 Big East Championships, with a personal-best mark of 15.50 meters.

Personal bests

Professional career

2001 NFL Draft
Moss was a first round (16th overall) pick in the 2001 NFL Draft by the New York Jets out of the University of Miami.

New York Jets

2001–2004
In the 2001 season, Moss made his NFL debut in Week 10 against the Miami Dolphins.
Moss made his first career catch in Week 12 against the New England Patriots.

In the 2002 season, Moss made his first career start in Week 1 against the Buffalo Bills.

Moss played a total of 51 games with the New York Jets and finished with 2,416 receiving yards, 19 touchdowns, 127 rushing yards, and 1,799 return yards.

Washington Redskins

2005 season
Following the 2004 season, Moss was acquired by the Washington Redskins in a trade with the New York Jets for Laveranues Coles. Moss signed a six-year contract with the Redskins on May 4, 2005.

Known for his big play potential, Moss started the 2005 season off with a bang in Week 2 against the Dallas Cowboys, where he caught two touchdown passes of 39 and 70 yards from Mark Brunell in the last five minutes to come from behind and beat the Cowboys 14–13.

His 2005 season with the Redskins was the best in his professional career, with 84 receptions for 1,483 yards (second highest in the NFL that year, behind only Steve Smith of the Carolina Panthers), setting a new Redskins single-season receiving record, and nine touchdowns. In 2005, Moss also was selected to his first and only NFL Pro Bowl.  Moss recorded 18 rushing yards and 3 catches for 39 receiving yards at the Pro Bowl.

2006 season

In the first three games of the 2006 season, he recorded only 13 catches for 188 yards. On October 1, 2006, however, Moss exploded for a season-high 138 yards on 4 catches, hauling in two touchdowns of 55 and 8 yards, as well as a 68-yard game-winning touchdown to give Washington the victory in overtime over the visiting Jacksonville Jaguars 36–30.
Due to injuries that kept him inactive much of the year and less than 100% when he did play, Moss finished the 2006 season with 790 yards and 6 touchdowns on 55 receptions.

2007 season
In the 2007 season, Moss started and played in 14 games and recorded 61 receptions, 808 receiving yards, and three touchdowns.

2008 season
In the 2008 season, Moss recorded over 1,000 receiving yards for the third time in his career.

2009 season
Starting in all 16 games in 2009, Moss recorded 70 receptions, 902 receiving yards, and three touchdowns.

2010 season
In the 2010 season, the last season of his contract with the Redskins, Moss recorded 1,115 receiving yards making this the fourth time in his career that he recorded over 1,000 receiving yards. He achieved a new career high of 93 receptions to go along with six touchdowns in the 2010 season.

2011 season
With his original contract ending, Moss re-signed with the Redskins. On July 26, the Redskins signed him to a three-year, $15 million contract that included a $5 million signing bonus.
He was made offensive co-captain along with Trent Williams.
In Week 7 against the Carolina Panthers, Moss suffered a broken left hand.
He made his return to the field in Week 12 against the Seattle Seahawks.
In Week 14 against the New England Patriots, Moss caught a 49-yard touchdown pass from wide receiver Brandon Banks, the first passing touchdown of Banks' career.
Working mostly out of the slot receiver position, Moss played and started 12 games and recorded 46 receptions, 584 receiving yards, and four touchdowns in the 2011 season.

2012 season
During the preseason, it was reported that Moss lost 15 pounds to prepare for the 2012 season. After seven consecutive seasons of being a starter for the Redskins, his responsibility was reduced to more of a third-down slot receiver due to the team's additions of Pierre Garçon and Josh Morgan, who became the team's new starters. In the Week 5 loss against the Atlanta Falcons, he caught a 77-yard touchdown pass from second-string quarterback, Kirk Cousins. He would later score the only two touchdowns for the Redskins in the Week 7 loss against the New York Giants. In the Week 11 win against the Philadelphia Eagles, Moss caught a 61-yard touchdown pass from rookie Robert Griffin III while under double coverage.

2013 season
During the 2013 offseason, Moss restructured his contract in order to clear up cap space. After the Week 11 game against the Philadelphia Eagles, he surpassed 10,000 career receiving yards making him the seventh active player at that time to reach this milestone along with Tony Gonzalez, Reggie Wayne, Andre Johnson, Steve Smith, Larry Fitzgerald, and Anquan Boldin.

2014 season
Set to become a free agent for 2014, Moss re-signed on a one-year deal to remain with the Redskins on March 11, 2014.

During a Redskins-Giants game on December 14, 2014, a touchdown in the closing seconds of the first half by quarterback Robert Griffin III was overturned by official Jeff Triplette after he saw that Griffin had fumbled the ball in the end zone. Moss angrily confronted Triplette and the officiating crew as they walked back to the locker room.  An unsportsmanlike conduct penalty was assessed against Moss, and he was also ejected from the game, for which he heavily protested.

Retirement
On September 1, 2022, Moss was inducted into Washington's Greatest Players list in honor of the franchise's 90th anniversary.

NFL career statistics

Personal life
He is the older brother of former NFL wide receiver Sinorice Moss, who previously played for the New York Giants during their Super Bowl XLII win. He is also the older maternal cousin of Minnesota Vikings cornerback Patrick Peterson, and the older paternal cousin of Indianapolis Colts running back Zack Moss.

In 2008 he married Latosha Moss. They have four children together.

In May 2010, The Washington Post reported that Moss allegedly received human growth hormones from doctor Anthony Galea.

Moss made several appearances in television commercials for Easterns Automotive Group, a local car dealership group in the Washington, D.C. and Baltimore, Maryland areas, alongside Chief Zee, Antwaan Randle El, and Willis McGahee.

In 2016, Moss earned a Master of Business Administration degree from the University of Miami Business School.

In March 2017, it was announced that Moss would be a color commentator for the Washington Valor of the Arena Football League.  

Moss announced the Commanders’ second round pick, number 47 overall, in the 2022 NFL Draft.  The pick was Phidarian Mathis.

References

External links
 Miami Hurricanes bio
 Washington Redskins bio
 NFL bio

1979 births
Living people
African-American players of American football
All-American college football players
American football wide receivers
Miami Hurricanes football players
National Conference Pro Bowl players
New York Jets players
Players of American football from Miami
Miami Carol City Senior High School alumni
Washington Redskins players
Arena football announcers
21st-century African-American sportspeople
20th-century African-American sportspeople
10,000 receiving yards club